Inguromorpha itzalana is a moth in the family Cossidae. It is found in North America, where it has been recorded from Arizona, New Mexico and Texas. Outside of the United States, it is found from Mexico to Central America.

The wingspan is 38–44 mm. Adults have been recorded on wing from May to September.

References

Natural History Museum Lepidoptera generic names catalog

Hypoptinae
Taxa named by Herman Strecker
Moths described in 1900